The 1992–93 NBA season was the 47th season of the National Basketball Association. The season ended with the Chicago Bulls winning their third straight NBA Championship, beating the Phoenix Suns 4 games to 2 in the NBA Finals.

Notable occurrences

 The 1993 NBA All-Star Game was played at the Delta Center in Salt Lake City, Utah, with the West defeating the East 135–132 in overtime. Much to delight of the local fans, Karl Malone and John Stockton of the Utah Jazz were named co-MVPs of the game.
 The Phoenix Suns played their first season at America West Arena.
 The San Antonio Spurs played their final season in the HemisFair Arena.
 The Charlotte Hornets became the first of the four late 1980s expansion franchises to win a playoff series on Alonzo Mourning's 20-foot jumper at the buzzer in Game 4 of their first round playoff series against the Boston Celtics.
 Michael Jordan scored his 20,000th career point and tied Wilt Chamberlain's record of seven scoring titles.
 In Game 3 of the NBA Finals, the Suns defeated the Bulls in triple overtime, 129–121. This marked the second time a Finals game lasted three overtimes, along with Game 5 of the 1976 Finals, which also involved the Suns. Coincidentally, in the 1976 game, Paul Westphal played for the Suns, and in the 1993 game, he coached the Suns.
 Michael Jordan scored 40 or more points in 4 consecutive games of the NBA Finals, setting a record, and averaged an NBA Finals record 41.0 points per game for the series.
 The Chicago Bulls defeated the Phoenix Suns in the NBA Finals to become the first team in almost 30 years to win three consecutive championships.
 New Jersey Nets guard Dražen Petrović was killed in an automobile accident in Munich, Germany on June 7. Almost two months later, on July 27, Boston Celtics guard Reggie Lewis collapsed during practice and died of a heart condition later the same day. Both were later honored by their respective teams by retiring their numbers, and Petrovic would be eventually inducted into the Basketball Hall of Fame.
 The Dallas Mavericks became the third team to lose 70 games in a season, after the 1972–73 Philadelphia 76ers and the 1986–87 Los Angeles Clippers, they finished 11–71. They would later be joined by the 1997–98 Denver Nuggets, the 2009–10 New Jersey Nets and the 2015–16 Philadelphia 76ers.
 During the regular season, there were three instances where games had to be stopped due to damage to the goals.
On February 7 in the game between the Orlando Magic and the Phoenix Suns at America West Arena, Magic rookie Shaquille O'Neal went up for a dunk and the recoil due to his massive size was too much for the stanchion to bear; the supports detached and the basket folded in on itself.
On March 12, during a game between the Chicago Bulls and New Jersey Nets at Brendan Byrne Arena that was televised nationally on TNT, Nets forward Chris Morris shattered the glass behind the rim with a forceful dunk.
On April 23, in another game played in New Jersey between the Nets and Magic, O'Neal struck again; this time, he dunked with so much force that the entire backboard, including the shot clock positioned above it, was pulled off the goal. This led the league to provide stronger shatterproof backboards. However, every team is still required to have a spare backboard in their home arenas just in case.
Dennis Rodman played his last season with a normal hairstyle; after the Pistons traded him to the San Antonio Spurs for Sean Elliott in the ensuing offseason, he started to dye his hair in different colors.

1992–93 NBA changes
 The Atlanta Hawks changed their uniforms.
 The Chicago Bulls changed their uniforms.
 The Dallas Mavericks changed their road uniforms from green to blue.
 The New York Knicks changed their logo.
 The Phoenix Suns changed their logo, uniforms, and moved into the America West Arena.

Standings

By division
 Eastern Conference

 Western Conference

By conference

Notes
 z – Clinched home court advantage for the entire playoffs
 c – Clinched home court advantage for the conference playoffs
 y – Clinched division title
 x – Clinched playoff spot

Playoffs

Teams in bold advanced to the next round. The numbers to the left of each team indicate the team's seeding in its conference, and the numbers to the right indicate the number of games the team won in that round. The division champions are marked by an asterisk. Home court advantage does not necessarily belong to the higher-seeded team, but instead the team with the better regular season record; teams enjoying the home advantage are shown in italics.

Statistics leaders

NBA awards

Yearly awards
 Most Valuable Player: Charles Barkley, Phoenix Suns
 Rookie of the Year: Shaquille O'Neal, Orlando Magic
 Defensive Player of the Year: Hakeem Olajuwon, Houston Rockets
 Sixth Man of the Year: Clifford Robinson, Portland Trail Blazers
 Most Improved Player: Mahmoud Abdul-Rauf, Denver Nuggets
 Coach of the Year: Pat Riley, New York Knicks

 All-NBA First Team:
 F – Karl Malone, Utah Jazz
 F – Charles Barkley, Phoenix Suns
 C – Hakeem Olajuwon, Houston Rockets
 G – Michael Jordan, Chicago Bulls
 G – Mark Price, Cleveland Cavaliers

 All-NBA Second Team:
 F – Dominique Wilkins, Atlanta Hawks
 F – Larry Johnson, Charlotte Hornets
 C – Patrick Ewing, New York Knicks
 G – John Stockton, Utah Jazz
 G – Joe Dumars, Detroit Pistons

 All-NBA Third Team:
 F – Scottie Pippen, Chicago Bulls
 F – Derrick Coleman, New Jersey Nets
 C – David Robinson, San Antonio Spurs
 G – Tim Hardaway, Golden State Warriors
 G – Dražen Petrović, New Jersey Nets

NBA All-Defensive First Team:
 F – Scottie Pippen, Chicago Bulls
 F – Dennis Rodman, Detroit Pistons
 C – Hakeem Olajuwon, Houston Rockets
 G – Michael Jordan, Chicago Bulls
 G – Joe Dumars, Detroit Pistons

 NBA All-Defensive Second Team:
 F – Horace Grant, Chicago Bulls
 F – Larry Nance, Cleveland Cavaliers
 C – David Robinson, San Antonio Spurs
 G – Dan Majerle, Phoenix Suns
 G – John Starks, New York Knicks

NBA All-Rookie First Team:
 Shaquille O'Neal, Orlando Magic
 Christian Laettner, Minnesota Timberwolves
 LaPhonso Ellis, Denver Nuggets
 Alonzo Mourning, Charlotte Hornets
 Tom Gugliotta, Washington Bullets

 NBA All-Rookie Second Team:
 Walt Williams, Sacramento Kings
 Clarence Weatherspoon, Philadelphia 76ers
 Latrell Sprewell, Golden State Warriors
 Robert Horry, Houston Rockets
 Richard Dumas, Phoenix Suns

Player of the week

The following players were named NBA Player of the Week.

Player of the month
The following players were named NBA Player of the Month.

Rookie of the month
The following players were named NBA Rookie of the Month.

Coach of the month
The following coaches were named NBA Coach of the Month.

References